Tricolore is the debut album by Derbyshire trio Haiku Salut. The album was released in April 2013 under How Does It Feel To Be Loved? record label.

Track listing

References

2013 debut albums